Ickwell May Day is a celebration of spring held at Ickwell in the parish of Northill. The earliest documented Ickwell May Day festivities were in 1565.  By then it had become a Christian festival, though its origins likely pre-date Christianity to the pagan Beltane festivals.  In 1872 the squire of the town erected a permanent Maypole and left a bequest in his will to fund the annual celebration.

Like many English festivals, the Ickwell May Day is usually accompanied by Morris dancing—in this case, the Ickwell Mayers, with their Lord and Lady, and the dirty-faced Moggies.  Many other customs associated with the day have been recorded over the years.  One, unique to Ickwell, is that of the Old Scholars, a group of alumni of the village school.  The Old Scholars dance around the maypole, some with two or even three generations of their offspring.

In 1945, the Ickwell and District May Day Committee was formed.  The Committee organizes the games, refreshments, contests, dances, music and other activities, including the crowning of the May Queen.  Due to its documented age and long history, the Ickwell May Day has become something of an attraction, and is listed on the East of England Tourist Board's publicity sheet for "May Day Bank Holiday in the East of England."

References
 Ickwell May Day home page
 May Day Bank Holiday in the East of England (pdf format)

Holidays in England
Festivals in Bedfordshire
Spring (season) events in England